Tauhoa is a rural community in the Auckland Region of New Zealand's North Island.

State Highway 16 runs through the area, connecting to Wellsford 15 km to the north-east and Glorit 12 km to the south. Te Pahi Stream flows through the area and into the Tauhoa River, which drains into the southern Kaipara Harbour to the west.

History and culture

European settlement
The Tauhoa block, together with the Hoteo block inland of it, together comprising , were purchased from the Māori chief Te Keene and others in March 1867. Land at Tauhoa was first offered for sale to settlers in 1868, but in 1875 some of the land was still being surveyed for future settlement. Some of the land occupied by settlers in the 1870s was abandoned in the 1880s.

A tramway operated during the 1880s to bring kauri logs down to Te Pahi Stream, where sailing ships could take them away. The barque Mary Mildred was stranded and wrecked in the Tauhoa River with a load of kauri. The small steamer S.S. Mary Allen was built at Tauhoa and transported goods between Te Pahi Creek and the northern Wairoa River in the early 1880s.

A Highway Board operated in the area from 1876 to 1906. A road north to Port Albert was described as "a good summer road" in 1880. By 1886, a route south to Kaukapakapa was complete and bridged, but was still impassable in winter. A small portion of the road at Tauhoa was metalled in 1899. In the late 1920s, the road from Tauhoa to the railway station at Hoteo was designated a highway, and metalled. Other roads in the area were mostly metalled by the mid-1930s.

Gum-diggers were active in the area up before 1910.

Demographics
The SA1 area is part of the larger Kaipara Hills statistical area.

The SA1 statistical area had a population of 132 at the 2018 New Zealand census, an increase of 9 people (7.3%) since the 2013 census, and an increase of 6 people (4.8%) since the 2006 census. There were 45 households, comprising 60 males and 72 females, giving a sex ratio of 0.83 males per female. The median age was 42.2 years (compared with 37.4 years nationally), with 36 people (27.3%) aged under 15 years, 18 (13.6%) aged 15 to 29, 63 (47.7%) aged 30 to 64, and 21 (15.9%) aged 65 or older.

Ethnicities were 90.9% European/Pākehā, 27.3% Māori, 2.3% Pacific peoples, 4.5% Asian, and 0.0% other ethnicities. People may identify with more than one ethnicity.

Although some people chose not to answer the census's question about religious affiliation, 59.1% had no religion, 27.3% were Christian and 6.8% had Māori religious beliefs.

Of those at least 15 years old, 21 (21.9%) people had a bachelor's or higher degree, and 15 (15.6%) people had no formal qualifications. The median income was $27,600, compared with $31,800 nationally. 15 people (15.6%) earned over $70,000 compared to 17.2% nationally. The employment status of those at least 15 was that 51 (53.1%) people were employed full-time and 18 (18.8%) were part-time.

Kaipara Hills statistical area

Kaipara Hills had a population of 1,965 at the 2018 New Zealand census, an increase of 279 people (16.5%) since the 2013 census, and an increase of 492 people (33.4%) since the 2006 census. There were 630 households, comprising 1,005 males and 963 females, giving a sex ratio of 1.04 males per female. The median age was 41.3 years (compared with 37.4 years nationally), with 465 people (23.7%) aged under 15 years, 288 (14.7%) aged 15 to 29, 1,008 (51.3%) aged 30 to 64, and 204 (10.4%) aged 65 or older.

Ethnicities were 87.6% European/Pākehā, 18.5% Māori, 1.7% Pacific peoples, 2.9% Asian, and 1.8% other ethnicities. People may identify with more than one ethnicity.

The percentage of people born overseas was 22.0, compared with 27.1% nationally.

Although some people chose not to answer the census's question about religious affiliation, 59.2% had no religion, 26.1% were Christian, 4.0% had Māori religious beliefs, 0.5% were Hindu, 0.2% were Muslim, 0.6% were Buddhist and 2.0% had other religions.

Of those at least 15 years old, 258 (17.2%) people had a bachelor's or higher degree, and 252 (16.8%) people had no formal qualifications. The median income was $34,400, compared with $31,800 nationally. 297 people (19.8%) earned over $70,000 compared to 17.2% nationally. The employment status of those at least 15 was that 843 (56.2%) people were employed full-time, 261 (17.4%) were part-time, and 30 (2.0%) were unemployed.

Marae

The local Puatahi Marae is a traditional meeting ground for local Māori. It is affiliated with Ngāti Whātua and Ngāti Whātua o Kaipara, and their iwi of Ngāti Hine and Ngāti Rāngo or Rongo.

The marae includes Te Manawanui, a wharenui or meeting house.

Education
Tauhoa School is a coeducational full primary (years 1-8) school with a roll of   students as of 

The school celebrated its 125th jubilee in 2004.

Notes

Rodney Local Board Area
Populated places in the Auckland Region
Populated places around the Kaipara Harbour